Charles or Charlie Martin may refer to:

Sports
Charles Martin (American football) (1959–2005), American football player
Charles Martin (boxer) (born 1986), American heavyweight boxer
Charles Martin (English cricketer) (1836–1878), English cricketer
Charles Martin (South Australia cricketer) (1863-1954), Australian cricketer
Charles Martin (Tasmania cricketer) (1888–1951), Australian cricketer
Charles Martin (Queensland cricketer) (1867–1942), Australian cricketer
Charlie Martin (Australian footballer) (1883–1955), Australian rules football player
Charlie Christina Martin (born 1981), British racing car driver
Charlie Martin (1913–1998), British racing driver

Politics and government
Charles D. Martin (politician) (1829–1911), U.S. Representative from Ohio
Charles H. Martin (North Carolina politician) (1848–1931), U.S. Representative from North Carolina
Charles Martin (Canadian politician) (1881–1957), member of the Ontario Legislative Assembly
Charles Martin (Alabama politician) (1931–2012), American politician
Charles Martin (Illinois politician) (1856–1917), U. S. Representative from Illinois
Charles Wykeham Martin (1801–1870), English Liberal Party politician
Charles Martin (Oregon politician) (1863–1946), U.S. military officer, governor and Representative from Oregon
Workneh Eshete (1864-1952), Ethiopian doctor and diplomat who took the name Charles Martin

Arts and literature
 Charles James Martin (artist) (1886–1955), American modernist artist and arts instructor
 Charles Martin (1820–1906), British artist, son of John Martin
 Charles Martin (artist) (1884–1934), French artist and illustrator
 Charles Martin (director), British television director
 Charles Martin (1562–1646), French painter of King Henry IV of France
 Charles Martin (poet) (born 1942), American poet and educator
 Charles Martin (author) (born 1969), American author
 Charles G. Martin (actor) (born 1912), American actor known for The Shootist with John Wayne

Science
Charles James Martin (physiologist) (1866–1955), British scientist
Charles R. Martin (born 1959), American professor of chemistry
Charlie Martin (scientist) (1926–1999), British scientist

Other
Charles B. Martin (1924–2008), Australian philosopher
Charles Martin (educator) (1817–1888), Acting President of Hampden–Sydney College (1848–1849, 1856–1857)
Charles D. Martin (minister) (1873–1942), West Indian Moravian minister
Charles A. Martin, Chief Scout of the Boy Scouts of South Africa
Charles Martin, the adopted name of Hakim Workneh Eshete (1864–1952), Ethiopian physician, diplomat, and intellectual
Charles Charrington Martin (1854–1926), British actor and barrister
Charles Irving Martin (1871–1953), American military officer

See also
Chuck Martin (disambiguation)